In enzymology, a D-alanine—alanyl-poly(glycerolphosphate) ligase is an enzyme that catalyzes the chemical reaction

ATP + D-alanine + alanyl-poly(glycerolphosphate)  ADP + phosphate + D-alanyl-alanyl-poly(glycerolphosphate)

The 3 substrates of this enzyme are ATP, D-alanine, and alanyl-poly(glycerolphosphate), whereas its 3 products are ADP, phosphate, and D-alanyl-alanyl-poly(glycerolphosphate).

This enzyme belongs to the family of ligases, specifically those forming carbon-nitrogen bonds as acid-D-amino-acid ligases (peptide synthases).  The systematic name of this enzyme class is D-alanine:alanyl-poly(glycerolphosphate) ligase (ADP-forming). Other names in common use include D-alanyl-alanyl-poly(glycerolphosphate) synthetase, D-alanine:membrane-acceptor ligase, D-alanylalanylpoly(phosphoglycerol) synthetase, D-alanyl-poly(phosphoglycerol) synthetase, and D-alanine-membrane acceptor-ligase.  This enzyme participates in d-alanine metabolism.

References 

 

EC 6.3.2
Enzymes of unknown structure